Conan Without Borders is an American travel show hosted by Conan O'Brien that aired on TBS in the United States as a series of specials on O'Brien's talk show Conan. The series began in February 2015 and included thirteen episodes when the series ceased production due to the onset of the COVID-19 pandemic in the United States and the subsequent ending of Conan. O'Brien has expressed interest in continuing the show in some form, though no plans have been announced yet. The episodes do not follow the traditional talk-show format of Conan, instead following O'Brien as he travels outside of the US and attempts to engage the locals and experience the unique cultural aspects of the area.

Background
O'Brien has a long history of featuring segments that occurred in the field, dubbed "remotes", ever since his first late-night show, Late Night with Conan O'Brien. They became some of his best-received segments, including a famous remote when O'Brien visited a historic, Civil War-era baseball league. The piece was one of O'Brien's personal favorites, later remarking, "When I leave this earth, at the funeral, just show this, because this pretty much says who I'm all about." 

The apotheosis of the Late Night remotes centered on the realization, in 2006, that O'Brien bore a striking resemblance to Tarja Halonen, entering her second term as president of Finland. Capitalizing on the resemblance and on the 2006 Finnish presidential election, O'Brien and Late Night aired mock political ads both in support of Halonen and against her main opponent, which influenced popular perception of the race, and traveled to Finland shortly after the election. "We took the show to Helsinki for five days," O'Brien recalled, "where we were embraced like a national treasure." As part of the five-day trip, which was released as a one-hour special episode of Late Night, O'Brien met with Halonen at the Finnish Presidential Palace.

History
O'Brien began hosting the show Conan on TBS in 2010. The first international travel special on the show was in February 2015. Following the onset of the Cuban thaw, O'Brien became the first American television personality to film in Cuba for more than half a century. A few months later, O'Brien visited Armenia in an episode that featured his assistant Sona Movsesian, who is Armenian American. While visiting, Conan guest-starred as a gangster on an Armenian soap opera.

In April 2016, O'Brien visited South Korea in response to a fan letter urging him to visit, as well as a growing fan base online. His visit included a trip to the Korean Demilitarized Zone, which resulted in O'Brien and Steven Yeun also visiting North Korea on a technicality by stepping across the border line at the DMZ. Conan commented on the significance during the sketch, claiming, "The idea that you and I could be in North Korea, talking and communicating freely, seems like kind of a cool message." These and subsequent hour-long international travel specials were branded Conan Without Borders and became part of their own series. Conan eventually travelled to thirteen countries in total.

In April 2017, O'Brien visited Mexico for "Conan Without Borders: Made in Mexico". The episode featured some of the traditional features of his talk show, including an opening monologue, which he delivered in Spanish, and had an entirely Mexican staff, crew, audience, and guests.

The series' final episode before the onset of travel restrictions due to the COVID-19 pandemic aired in September 2019, and Conan ended in June 2021. O'Brien traveled to thirteen countries in total. In August 2021, O'Brien stated he was interested in continuing Conan Without Borders in some capacity after the COVID-19 pandemic, with TBS stating in 2020 that the specials would continue to air on their channel.

The international shows became available on Netflix before moving to HBO Max.

Reception
The series became some of O'Brien's most popular work, winning an Emmy in 2018 and being nominated in 2019. The first episode in the series, "Conan in Cuba", was watched by around 1.81 million people according to Nielsen ratings, up from Conan's typical average of 642,000.

In a 2017 review by Daniel Finberg for The Hollywood Reporter, he stated "Conan’s global adventures have become his TBS show's greatest piece of differentiation from the dozen other shows in the late night and talk show space."

O'Brien himself reflected in an interview with Stephen Colbert in 2017 that the show helped him fulfill his "greatest joy" in "trying to make people laugh that don't even speak English, don't know who I am. [...] It's a little bit of sort of diplomacy through comedy. I like to show that Americans are curious, we're humbled. We're okay to look ridiculous. It's okay if you laugh at us."

Episodes

References

 
Conan O'Brien
English-language television shows
TBS (American TV channel) original programming
Television series by Conaco